Kannupada Poguthaiya is a 1999 Indian Tamil-language family drama film directed by Bharathi Ganesh. It stars Vijayakanth in dual lead roles as father and son. The score and soundtrack were composed by S. A. Rajkumar. The film released on 7 November 1999 and became a commercial success.

Plot 
Paramasivam, a rich landlord lives in a village along with his wife Parvathy. Vetrivel is their elder son and is widely respected by the villagers for his good deeds. Gowri is the daughter of Ramakrishnan, a school teacher in the same village. Gowri returns to village after completing education from city and at first misunderstands Vetrivel as an employee in Paramasivam's home. Later she gets to know that Vetrivel is the son of Paramasivam. Slowly Vetrivel and Gowri start liking each other. Paramasivam and Parvathy also plans to get them married.

Subramani is the younger brother of Vetrivel and he returns to the village after his completion of studies. One day, Subramani slips from a mountain nearby while taking photographs of a water fall. Gowri hears his voice and rushes to the spot along with other people and Subramani is rescued by the villagers. This makes Subramani to fall for Gowri and he expresses his intention of marrying Gowri to Vetrivel. Vetrivel is so kind towards his brother and he decides to sacrifice his love for the sake of his brother. Vetrivel also convinces Paramasivam and Parvathy to get married Subramani first although he is the younger son. Gowri is shocked knowing about the marriage plans but accepts just because of the respect she has towards Vetrivel's words. Subramani and Gowri get married.

Chinna works in Paramasivam's home and he could not tolerate Vetrivel's sacrifice. One day Chinna drinks and confesses the truth to Vetrivel's Parents. They decide to get Vetrivel married immediately to Rasathi, who is Parvathy's relative. But Rasathi's father Maniyaandar and grandfather Angaala Thevar have vengeance over Parvathy and Paramasivam and they wanted them to be killed.

Ponnambalam who also lives in the same village does not like Vetrivel and he informs Subramani that Vetrivel and Gowri are in illegitimate relationship which angers Subramani. But suddenly Gowri vomits and faints. Ramakrishnan, Father of Gowri informs everyone happily that Gowri should be pregnant. But Subramani is shocked as he has decided to have kids only after Vetrivel gets married. Now Subramani also doubts the relationship between his brother Vetrivel and Gowri. He shouts at Vetrivel and Vetrivel leaves the home after hearing painful words from his brother.

Paramasivam and Parvathy get angry seeing Subramani's activities and scold him. Also a flashback is told where Vetrivel is actually the son of Vasudevar Ayya who was a wealthy man in the village. Paramasivam worked as a driver in Parvathy's home and they marry each other. This angers Parvathy's father Angaala Thevar and her brother Maniyaandar, and they try to kill the couple. They run to Vasudevar Ayya's village for help and Vasudevar Ayya saves them. But Angaala Thevar and Maniyaandar kill Vasudevar Ayya. Now Vasudevar Ayya orders them to stay out of village and hands over his son Vetrivel and all the properties to Paramasivam and Parvathy.

In the meantime, doctor checks Gowri and informs that she is not pregnant. Subramani realizes his mistake and apologizes to Vetrivel and Gowri. Finally Vetrivel is married to Rasathi on request of Gowri and also wins the heart of her father.

Cast
Vijayakanth as Vetrivel and Vasudevar Ayya (dual role)
Simran as Gowri
Sivakumar as Paramasivam (Subramaniyam's father)
Lakshmi as Parvathy (Subramaniyam's mother)
Karan as Subramanian
Radhika Chowdry as Rasathi
Charle as Chinna (Vetrivel's servant)
Jai Ganesh as Ramakrishnan (Gowri's father)
Radha Ravi as Angaala Thevar (Parvathy's father)
Anandaraj as Maniyaandar (Angaala Thevar's son and Rasathi's father)
Sathyapriya as Paarijaatham (Rasathi's mother)
Ponnambalam as Kaduvetti Karuppusamy
Crane Manohar as Kathavarayan 
Lavanya as Tamilarasi 
Shakthi Kumar as Murugan

Soundtrack 
The soundtrack was composed by S. A. Rajkumar.

Release
Bharathi Ganesh later launched a project titled Velayudham starring Mammootty, Pratyusha and Eashwar, who had earlier starred in Love Channel (2001). The film was later stalled and Kannupada Poguthaiya remains the director's only release. It was later dubbed in Hindi as Karam Putra.

References

External links
 

1999 films
1990s Tamil-language films
Super Good Films films
Indian drama films
Films scored by S. A. Rajkumar